Nybøllegård may refer to:

 Nybøllegård, Funen, a manor house on Funen, Denmark
 Nybøllegård, Møn, a house on Møn, Denmark